Empire Alderney was a 288-ton coastal tanker which was built in 1943. She was renamed Mil 50 in 1946 and  Max S in 1955. Her fate is unknown, last being registered in the Cayman Islands in 1980.

History
Empire Alderney was built by J. Harker Ltd., Knottingley as yard number 166. She had a  Crossley engine. Empire Alderney was launched on 11 December 1943 and completed in June 1944. She was built for the Ministry of War Transport and managed by T J Metcalf.

In 1946, Empire Alderney was sold to Norsk Tankanlaeg of Norway and renamed Mil 50. She served with them for nine years and was sold to Partenrederei Max S, West Germany in 1955, being renamed Max S. In 1958, she was sold to the Marina Mercante Nicaragüense, Nicaragua, passing to the Compagnia Maritima Mundia in 1959. Max S was last recorded as being registered to Trafford Holdings Ltd, Cayman Islands in 1980.

Official number and code letters
Official Numbers were a forerunner to IMO Numbers.

Empire Alderney had the UK Official Number 180114 from 1943 to 1946 and used the Code Letters MQNH until 1946.

References

External links

1943 ships
Empire ships
Ships built in England
Ministry of War Transport ships
World War II tankers
Merchant ships of the United Kingdom
Merchant ships of West Germany
Merchant ships of Nicaragua
Tankers of Norway
Merchant ships of the Cayman Islands